The Customs House is a Grade II* listed building on the Quayside in Newcastle upon Tyne.

History
The building was built in 1766 and then altered and re-fronted by Sydney Smirke in 1833. It replaced an earlier facility for the collection of customs duties at the west end of Quayside. The royal coat of arms above the front door dates to the late Georgian era. The building is now occupied by barristers' offices.

References

Buildings and structures in Newcastle upon Tyne
Grade II* listed buildings in Tyne and Wear
Custom houses in the United Kingdom